TGF beta-inducible nuclear protein 1 is a protein that in humans is encoded by the NSA2 gene.

References

Further reading